The Bodo saltans virus is a giant virus of the Mimiviridae family that infects the protozoa Bodo saltans. It has a genome of 1.39 megabases, one of the largest known viral genomes.

References 

Mimiviridae